Verkhnyaya Buzinovka is a rural locality (a khutor) and the administrative center of Verkhnebuzinovskoye Rural Settlement, Kletsky District, Volgograd Oblast, Russia. The population was 900 as of 2010. There are 7 streets.

Geography 
Verkhnyaya Buzinovka is located in steppe on the right bank of the Liska River, 41 km southeast of Kletskaya (the district's administrative centre) by road. Nizhnyaya Buzinovka is the nearest rural locality.

References 

Rural localities in Kletsky District